The 2020 ESPY Awards were presented at the 28th annual ESPY Awards show, held on June 21, 2020 and broadcast on television nationwide in the United States on ESPN at 9 PM Eastern/8 PM Central. Sue Bird, Megan Rapinoe and Russell Wilson served as hosts. 

Due to the COVID-19 pandemic the event was hosted remotely. Instead of presenting traditional awards for athletic achievement during the event, awards were presented to honor extraordinary acts of activism and humanitarian efforts.

Winners and nominees

Honorary awards

Arthur Ashe Award for Courage

Kevin Love

Jimmy V Award

Taquarius Wair

Pat Tillman Award for Service
Kim Clavel

Stuart Scott ENSPIRE Award
WNBA and WNBA Players Association

Tribute
The show made a tribute to former NBA superstar Kobe Bryant, who died in a helicopter crash on January 26, 2020, along with eight others, including his 13-year-old daughter, Gianna. The tribute was narrated by rapper Snoop Dogg.

References

External links
 ESPN: Serving sports fans. Anytime. Anywhere. - ESPN

2020
ESPY
ESPY
ESPY
ESPY Awards